Tarsomordeo is an extinct genus of paralligatorid neosuchian known from the Early Cretaceous Twin Mountains Formation in Texas. It contains a single species, T. winkleri.

References 

Crocodylomorphs